= County of North Yorkshire =

County of North Yorkshire may refer to:

- the ceremonial county of North Yorkshire, England
- the legal name of North Yorkshire (district), a non-metropolitan county and unitary authority area which forms the greater part of the ceremonial county
